The 1988 Women's World Weightlifting Championships were held in Jakarta, Indonesia from December 2 to December 4, 1988. There were 103 women in action from 23 nations.

Medal summary

Medal table
Ranking by Big (Total result) medals 

Ranking by all medals: Big (Total result) and Small (Snatch and Clean & Jerk)

See also
 Weightlifting at the 1988 Summer Olympics

References
Results (Sport 123)
Weightlifting World Championships Seniors Statistics 

World Weightlifting Championships
World Weightlifting Championships
World Weightlifting Championships
Sport in Jakarta
World Weightlifting Championships
Weightlifting in Indonesia